Heart Revolution Church is a non-denominational, charismatic megachurch located in National City, California.

History 
The church was founded as Cornerstone Church of San Diego in 1999 by Sergio De La Mora (born 1966). He and his wife, Georgina de la Mora, were the senior pastors. The church averages about 4000 people in attendance each week. The church was recognized by Outreach magazine as being the third fastest growing church in America during the year 2009. In 2020, Cornerstone Church of San Diego renamed itself as Heart Revolution Church.

In 2021, Pastors TJ and Carissa Anglin took the lead pastor role because Sergio needed to step down.

Events and broadcasts 
The church hosts an annual "Heart Revolution Conference". Speakers at the 2010 conference include Hezekiah Walker, Tim Storey, Ed Young, Jr., and Steven Furtick. In 2010, the church hosted Ed Young, Jr's C3 West Coast Conference. The church has its 10am service broadcast locally in San Diego by KPRZ 1210 AM.

References 

Evangelical churches in San Diego
Evangelical churches in California
Evangelical megachurches in the United States
Megachurches in California
Churches in San Diego County, California
1999 establishments in California
Christian organizations established in 1999